"Don't Believe the Hype" is a song by hip hop group Public Enemy and the second single to be released from their second album, It Takes a Nation of Millions to Hold Us Back. The song's lyrics are mostly about the political issues that were current in the United States at the time of its release. "Don't Believe the Hype" charted at number 18 on the U.S. R&B chart and also reached a high of 18 in the UK Singles Chart in July 1988. Chuck D has stated the song was inspired by the works of Noam Chomsky.

The B-side includes "Prophets of Rage" and "The Rhythm The Rebel", an a cappella of the opening verse from "Rebel Without a Pause" which was a popular scratching phrase.

Charts

References

Public Enemy (band) songs
1988 songs
Song recordings produced by Rick Rubin
Political rap songs
Songs written by Chuck D
Songs written by Hank Shocklee
Songs written by Eric "Vietnam" Sadler
Songs written by Flavor Flav